Aethes tesserana is a moth of the family Tortricidae. It is found in most of Europe, the Near East and northern Iran.

Adults are on wing from May to August.

The larvae feed on the roots of Picris and Hieracium species.

Subspecies
Aethes tesserana tesserana
Aethes tesserana magister (Walsingham, 1900) (Asia Minor)

References

tesserana
Moths described in 1775
Moths of Asia
Moths of Europe